Yoshida (written: 吉田 lit. "lucky ricefield") is the 11th most common Japanese surname. A less common variant is 芳田 (lit. "fragrant ricefield"). Notable people with the surname include:

Ai Yoshida, Japanese sailor
, Japanese idol, singer and model
, Japanese video game artist
, Japanese footballer
, Japanese manga artist
, Japanese footballer
, Japanese rugby union player
, Japanese football
, Japanese Physical Therapist 
, Japanese singer
Asami Yoshida (disambiguation), multiple people
, Japanese rower
, Japanese artist
Baret Yoshida (born 1975), American mixed martial artist
Bill Yoshida (1921–2005), American comic book letterer
, Japanese puppeteer
, Japanese curler
, Japanese artist
, Japanese film director
, Japanese actor and singer
, Japanese javelin thrower
, Japanese baseball player
, Japanese artist
, 17th-century Japanese ukiyo-e artist
, Japanese cartographer
, Japanese cyclist
, Japanese judoka and mixed martial artist
, Japanese music critic and literary critic
, Japanese actress
, Japanese conductor
, Japanese politician
, Japanese painter and printmaker
, Japanese footballer and manager
, Japanese footballer
, Japanese artist
, Japanese architect
, Japanese politician
, Chinese-born Japanese table tennis player
, Japanese Shinto priest
Kanso Yoshida (1895–1973), Japanese-born British seaman
, Japanese baseball player
, one of the physicists after which the RKKY interaction is named
, Japanese cross-country skier
, Japanese film director and screenwriter
, Japanese swimmer
, Japanese footballer and manager
Ken'ichi Yoshida (disambiguation), multiple people
, Japanese anime producer and illustrator
Yoshida Kenkō (1283–1350), monk, author
, Japanese footballer
, Japanese swimmer
Kiso Yoshida (1919–2005), Japanese artist
, Japanese samurai and diplomat
, Japanese composer
, member of the World Scout Committee, World Scout Foundation, and the International Commissioner of the Boy Scouts of Nippon
, Japanese mathematician
, Japanese film director
Kōtarō Yoshida (disambiguation), multiple people
, Japanese synchronized swimmer
, Japanese footballer
, Japanese hurdler
, Japanese footballer
, Japanese volleyball player
, Japanese professional wrestler
, Japanese volleyball player
, Japanese footballer
, Japanese footballer
, Japanese women's footballer
Masami Yoshida (disambiguation), multiple people
Masao Yoshida (disambiguation), multiple people
, Japanese baseball player
, Japanese footballer
, Imperial Japanese Navy admiral
, Japanese footballer
, Japanese voice actress
, Japanese footballer and manager
, Japanese actor and musician
, Japanese footballer
, Japanese virologist
, Japanese footballer
, Imperial Japanese Navy officer and writer
, Japanese mathematician
, Japanese musician
, Japanese ballet dancer
, Japanese actor
, Japanese footballer
, Japanese video game producer, director and designer
, Japanese footballer
, Japanese computer scientist
, Japanese saxophonist
Ray Yoshida (1930–2009), American artist
, Japanese screenwriter and manga artist
, Japanese voice actress
, Japanese Nordic combined skier
, Japanese actress. She changed her stage name to Ai Yoshikawa in 2017.
, Japanese footballer
, Japanese idol, singer and rapper
, Japanese politician
Rui Yoshida (1864–1954), Japanese artist
, Japanese photojournalist
Ruriko Yoshida, Japanese-American mathematician and statistician
, Japanese sprinter
, Japanese footballer
, Japanese sport wrestler
, Japanese footballer
, Japanese footballer
, Japanese voice actress
, Japanese writer and communist
, Japanese voice actress
Sensha Yoshida, manga artist, known as the author of Utsurun Desu.
, Japanese volleyball player
, Japanese diplomat, politician and Prime Minister of Japan
, Japanese diplomat and politician
, Japanese baseball player
, Japanese scholar
, Japanese baseball player
, Japanese businessman
, Japanese writer
, Japanese baseball player and coach
, Japanese musician
, pen-name of Sunao Matsumoto, Japanese writer
, Japanese artist
, Japanese politician
, Japanese baseballer
, Japanese high jumper
, better known as Taka Michinoku, Japanese professional wrestler
, better known as Cyber Kong, Japanese professional wrestler
, Japanese comedian
, Japanese footballer
Takeshi Yoshida, Japanese engineer
, Japanese singer-songwriter
, Japanese puppeteer
, Japanese footballer
, Japanese illustrator and character designer
, Japanese musician
, Japanese architect
, Japanese nurse
, Japanese pathologist
, Japanese footballer
, Japanese actor
, Japanese rugby union player
, Japanese writer
, Japanese footballer and manager
, Japanese printmaker
, Japanese football referee
, Japanese sport wrestler
, Japanese samurai
, Japanese judoka
, Japanese footballer and manager
, Japanese footballer and manager
, Japanese footballer
, Japanese footballer
, Japanese actress
, Japanese rugby union player
, Japanese sport wrestler
Yoshio Yoshida (disambiguation), multiple people
, Japanese film director and screenwriter
, Japanese mixed martial artist
, Japanese sailor
, Japanese tennis player
Yuka Yoshida (cricketer) (born 1989), Japanese women cricketer
Yuki Yoshida, Canadian film producer
, Japanese curler
, Japanese baseball player
, Japanese footballer
, Japanese politician
, Japanese judoka
, Imperial Japanese Navy admiral
Luka Yoshida-Martin (born 2001), Australian rules footballer

Fictional characters
, a character in the manga series Detective Conan
, a character in the manga series Kimi ni Todoke
Jin Yoshida, a character in the video game Soma
, a character in the light novel series Shakugan no Shana
, better known as Sunpyre, a character in Marvel Comics
Miki Yoshida, a character in the OEL manga series Miki Falls
, better known as Sunfire, a character in Marvel Comics
, a character in the manga series Assassination Classroom
, a character in the light novel series Is This a Zombie?
Masaki Yoshida (吉田 茉咲), a secondary character in the manga WataMote 
Saki Yoshida (吉田咲), the main character of the infamous hentai manga Metamorphosis (sometimes called Emergence)

References

See also
Yoshida Brothers, Shamisen musicians

Japanese-language surnames